Mark Porter may refer to:

 Mark Porter (designer) (born 1960), British publication art director
 Mark Porter (anaesthetist) (born 1962), British consultant anaesthetist and chairman of the British Medical Association
 Mark Porter (general practitioner) (born 1962), British television and radio presenter, and GP
 Mark Porter (racing driver) (1975–2006), V8 Supercar driver killed in a crash at Bathurst
 Mark Porter (footballer) (born 1976), Australian rules footballer for Carlton and North Melbourne
 Mark Porter (writer) (born 1960), Scottish based travel writer and publisher